= A Manual of Dermatology for Developing Countries =

Medical textbook by Orlando Canizares

- Author: Orlando Canizares
- Publisher: Oxford University Press
- Publication date: 1981

A Manual of Dermatology for Developing Countries is a medical textbook edited by Orlando Canizares, and first published in 1982 by Oxford University Press. A second edition was published posthumously in 1993. Canizares had finished the second edition shortly before his death in 1992.
